Euriphene lomaensis, the Loma nymph, is a butterfly in the family Nymphalidae. It is found in Sierra Leone and Ivory Coast.  It is normally found in forests.

References

Butterflies described in 1986
Euriphene